Daniel Kelly (born 16 June 2001) is an English professional rugby union player for Leicester Tigers in Premiership Rugby.  His usual position is centre.  Born in Manchester, England, Kelly represented Ireland Under 20s, before being capped for the  national team in 2021.

Career
Kelly started playing rugby at under six years old for Rochdale RUFC, in Greater Manchester. He joined Kirkham Grammar School at 16 and was part of the Sale Sharks academy set up.  Due to a number of other players considered more talented he was not offered a professional contract at 18 so joined Loughborough University.

On 10 April 2020 Kelly signed for Leicester Tigers, joining for the end of the delayed 2019-20 Premiership Rugby season. He made his debut as a substitute in a 46–30 defeat to Gloucester at Kingsholm. He quickly became a regular starter at inside centre, and by April 2022 was being highlighted by team mates as a defence leader as Leicester prepared for a European Rugby Champions Cup round of 16 tie with Clermont Auvergne.

References

External links

2001 births
Living people
English rugby union players
Leicester Tigers players
Rugby union centres
England international rugby union players
Loughborough Students RUFC players
Rugby union players from Rochdale
English people of Irish descent
People educated at Kirkham Grammar School